Edward Chetwynd (1577–1639) was an English churchman, Dean of Bristol from 1617.

Life
A native of Ingestre in Staffordshire, he entered Exeter College, Oxford, in 1592, where he graduated B.A. in 1595, M.A. in 1598, and B.D. in 1606. He was chosen lecturer to the Corporation of Abingdon in 1606, and in the following year lecturer to the Corporation of Bristol. In 1613 he was appointed Chaplain to Queen Anne of Denmark. He took the degree of D.D. in 1616, and was appointed Dean of Bristol in 1617. He also held the vicarages of Banwell in Somerset and Berkeley, Gloucestershire, and was Rector of Sutton Coldfield before 1617.

He published Concio ad Clerum pro gradu habita Oxoniae 19 Dec. 1607, Oxford, and some sermons. John Chetwynd was his son; he married Helena, daughter of John Harington as his second wife in 1620.

Notes

References

1577 births
1639 deaths
17th-century English Anglican priests
Deans of Bristol
People from the Borough of Stafford